Katherine Lee Schwennsen is an American architect. She is a fellow with the American Institute of Architects and was the group's president from 2005 to 2006. 
In 2010 she was chosen to chair Clemson University’s School of Architecture 

Schwennsen is a licensed architect in Iowa and received her Master of Architecture degree from Iowa State. She was the 82nd president of the American Institute of Architects, the second woman to be elected to lead the group, and second educator to serve as the group's leader. She is an advocate of diversity and sustainability.

References

Architects from Iowa
Clemson University faculty
Living people
Fellows of the American Institute of Architects
Presidents of the American Institute of Architects
Iowa State University alumni
Year of birth missing (living people)